The Clinton County Courthouse is a historic courthouse located at 50 North Jackson Street in Frankfort, Clinton County, Indiana, United States. The Clinton County Courthouse dates from 1882–1884. It was designed by George W. Bunting, who also designed courthouses in Anderson (Madison County) and Franklin (Johnson County). The Clinton County Courthouse is a three-story, Second Empire style limestone building adorned with statuary and a 165-foot domed central tower with a clock. The courthouse cost $170,450 to build in 1882. The courthouse is still in use as the county courthouse.

A virtual duplicate of the Clinton Courthouse was built in Anderson, Indiana (razed) in red brick at the same time as the Clinton County Courthouse.

It was added to the National Register of Historic Places in 1978. It is located in the Frankfort Commercial Historic District.

References

Further reading
Counts, Will, and Jon Dilts.  The Magnificent 92 Indiana Courthouses.  Beverly: Quarry, 1991, 30–31.

External links

Photos of the courthouse
Photographs of the Clinton County Courthouse from the Ball State University Digital Media Repository

County courthouses in Indiana
Courthouses on the National Register of Historic Places in Indiana
Second Empire architecture in Indiana
Government buildings completed in 1882
Buildings and structures in Clinton County, Indiana
Clock towers in Indiana
National Register of Historic Places in Clinton County, Indiana
1882 establishments in Indiana
Historic district contributing properties in Indiana